Hedgeable, Inc. is a U.S. based financial services company and digital wealth management platform headquartered in New York City. Hedgeable doesn’t follow set allocations, but actively manages accounts in response to market movements. 

On August 9, 2018, Hedgeable closed its doors to new investors, with existing investors required to transfer out of the company. The company claimed that it was not shutting down but simply removing its SEC registration.

History 
Hedgeable was founded in 2009 by twin brothers Michael and Matthew Kane, who previously worked at high-net worth investment managers such as Bridgewater Associates and Spruce Private Investors. Both Michael and Matthew graduated from Penn State University with degrees in Finance. Hedgeable is a Registered Investment Advisor with the U.S. Securities and Exchange Commission. The company has received funding from SixThirty and Route 66 Ventures as well as various other angel investors. On August 9, 2018, Hedgeable closed its doors to new investors.

Investing Strategies 
Hedgeable does not follow a buy-and-hold approach, but instead actively manages accounts in response to market movements focusing on downside protection in bear markets. This strategy is different from other robo-advisors, which use Modern Portfolio Theory.

Hedgeable offers investment options including Exchange Traded Funds (ETFs) to individual stocks, master limited partnerships, private equity and bitcoin. Mutual funds are not used in portfolios.

Although the firm's focus is to provide a direct-to-consumer service, Hedgeable's investment strategies are available to financial advisors and institutions as well through a variety of platforms.

Product Features

Hedgeable aims to gamify personal finance for clients. Clients can open a new account or transfer an existing account. Hedgeable accepts retirement accounts, taxable accounts, business accounts and various other account types. Hedgeable offers unique features such as:
 Downside protection
 Account aggregation
 Alternative investments
 Alpha rewards
 API
 Mobile app
It was awarded 4/5 for client transparency by Paladin Research. Hedgeable was the winner of the Finovate Fall 2015 Best of Show Award and the GREAT 2015 Tech Award (FinTech Category).

Future Endeavors
In 2016, Hedgeable launched its first iOS mobile app in order to expand their product offerings and is looking to expand globally in the future.

References

Financial services companies of the United States
Companies based in New York City
2009 establishments in New York City
American companies established in 2009
Financial services companies established in 2009
Mobile applications